Joshua Gaston Kitolano (born 3 August 2001) is a Norwegian football player who plays as midfielder for the Eredivisie club Sparta Rotterdam.

Club career
On 21 June 2022, Kitolano signed a four-year contract with Dutch club Sparta Rotterdam that came into effect at the end of July 2022.

Career statistics

Personal life
Kitolano, who has seven siblings, came to Norway from DR Congo in October 2005. Of them is two sisters who also are talents in football, his younger sisters Nema and Anne. Kitolano's older brother John plays for Aalesund, whilst his oldest brother Eric plays for Tromsø.

References

2001 births
Living people
Democratic Republic of the Congo emigrants to Norway
Sportspeople from Skien
Norwegian footballers
Eliteserien players
Odds BK players
Association football midfielders
Norway youth international footballers